Larsenia scalaroides is a species of extremely small sea snail, a marine gastropod mollusk or micromollusk in the family Vanikoridae.

Distribution

Description 
The maximum recorded shell length is 1.9 mm.

Habitat 
The minimum recorded depth is 156 m; the maximum recorded depth is 900 m.

References

Vanikoridae
Gastropods described in 1989